Giuseppe Battaglia (died December 1669) was a Roman Catholic prelate who served as Bishop of Montemarano (1657–1669).

Biography
On 9 July 1657, during the papacy of Pope Alexander VII, the appointment of Giuseppe Battaglia as Bishop of Montemarano was approved. 
On 23 September 1657, he was consecrated bishop by Ranuccio Scotti Douglas, Bishop Emeritus of Borgo San Donnino, with Patrizio Donati, Bishop Emeritus of Minori, and Gerolamo Bollini, Bishop of Isernia, serving as co-consecrators.
He served as Bishop of Montemarano until his death in December 1669.

References

External links and additional sources
 (for Chronology of Bishops) 
 (for Chronology of Bishops)  

17th-century Italian Roman Catholic bishops
Bishops appointed by Pope Alexander VII
1669 deaths